The Sacred Heart Cathedral, Yangzhou, also known as Catholic Church of the Sacred Heart of Jesus, is  a Gothic Revival Roman Catholic cathedral in Yangzhou, Jiangsu, China. It is the seat of Apostolic Prefecture of Yangzhou.

History 
In 1873, French Jesuit priest Henri Le Lec came to Yangzhou, Jiangsu, buying a land to build a church. The construction project of the church was launched in 1973 and was completed in 1875. French Jesuit and missionary Adrien Languillat consecrated the church on 1 January 1876. 

In 1949, the Roman Curia set up the Apostolic Prefecture of Yangzhou and the church services as the cathedral since then. In 1966, the Cultural Revolution broke out, the bell tower and Crucifixion were removed and the altar was smashed by the Red Guards. And the church was used as factory floor. The church was officially reopened to the public in 1982. It was renovated and refurbished in 1985. In April 1995, it was designated as a provincial cultural relic preservation organ by the Jiangsu government.

Architecture 

References 

Roman Catholic cathedrals in China
1875 establishments in China
Churches completed in 1875
Churches in Yangzhou
Gothic Revival church buildings in China
Roman Catholic churches in Jiangsu